The Found Bride (Germany: Die gefundene Braut) is a 1925 German silent comedy film directed by Rochus Gliese and starring Xenia Desni, André Mattoni and Jenny Jugo. It premiered on 28 April 1925 at the Tauentzienpalast in Berlin.

Cast
 Xenia Desni as Lucy 
 André Mattoni as Harry 
 Jenny Jugo as Gussy 
 Lydia Potechina as Runde tante 
 Alexander Murski as Gussys Onkel 
 Emilie Kurz as Spitze Tante 
 Cali Kaiser-Lin as Harrys Diener Chang 
 Karl Brose as Faktotum Tom 
 Walter Werner as Wirt 
 Neumann-Schüler as Gendarm 
 Elsa Wagner as Frau Thompson

References

Bibliography
 Hardt, Ursula. From Caligari to California: Erich Pommer's life in the International Film Wars. Berghahn Books, 1996.
 Kreimeier, Klaus. The Ufa Story: A History of Germany's Greatest Film Company, 1918-1945. University of California Press, 1999.

External links

1925 films
1925 comedy films
Films of the Weimar Republic
German silent feature films
German comedy films
Films directed by Rochus Gliese
Films produced by Erich Pommer
UFA GmbH films
German black-and-white films
Silent comedy films
1920s German films
1920s German-language films